Lesbian, gay, bisexual, and transgender (LGBT) rights are liberal in Ceará. Same-sex marriage is legal in the state.

Same-sex unions
On 7 March 2013, Ceará's state general attorney, Francisco Sales Neto, ruled in decision 02/2013 that all notaries statewide are obligated to accept same-sex marriages. The decision took effect on 15 March 2013.

References

Ceara
Ceará